Brad Tabke (pronounced ; born May 11, 1979) is an American politician serving in the Minnesota House of Representatives since 2023, having previously served from 2019-2022. A member of the Minnesota Democratic–Farmer–Labor Party (DFL), Tabke represents District 54A in the southwestern Twin Cities metropolitan area, which includes the city of Shakopee and portions of Scott County, Minnesota.

Early life, education, and career
Tabke was raised in Moville, Iowa. Tabke attended Iowa State University, graduating with a Bachelor of Science in horticulture.

Tabke owns a consulting firm located in downtown Shakopee, Minnesota and is a founder of the Shakopee Diversity Alliance. He is a former member of the Transportation Advisory Board for the Metropolitan Council, former chair of the Shakopee Chamber of Commerce, and former chair of the Shakopee Parks and Recreation Advisory Board. Tabke was mayor of Shakopee, first elected in 2011 and re-elected in 2013.

Minnesota House of Representatives
Tabke was first elected to the Minnesota House of Representatives in 2018, defeating Erik Mortensen who beat Republican incumbent Bob Loonan in a primary. Tabke lost reelection in 2020 against Mortensen. Tabke ran again and defeated Mortensen in 2022 and is serving his second non-consecutive term.

Tabke is the vice-chair of the Transportation Finance and Policy Committee, and sits on the Agriculture Finance and Policy, Commerce Finance and Policy, and Public Safety Finance and Policy Committees. He also serves as an assistant majority leader for the DFL House Caucus.

Electoral history

Personal life
Tabke and his wife, Katy, have two children. He has resided in Shakopee, Minnesota since 2003.

References

External links

 Official House of Representatives website
 Official campaign website

1979 births
Living people
Democratic Party members of the Minnesota House of Representatives
21st-century American politicians